Timandra (minor planet designation: 603 Timandra) is a minor planet orbiting the Sun that was discovered by American astronomer Joel Hastings Metcalf on February 16, 1906, in Taunton, Massachusetts.

Photometric observations of this asteroid at the Organ Mesa Observatory in Las Cruces, New Mexico, during 2010 gave a light curve with a long rotation period of 41.79 ± 0.02 hours and a brightness variation of 0.10 ± 0.02 in magnitude.

References

External links
 
 

Background asteroids
Timandra
19060216
Timandra